Alexandru Iulian Stoica (born 30 June 1997) is a Romanian professional footballer who plays as a midfielder or forward for Gloria Bistrița-Năsăud.

Honours

Club
Viitorul Constanța
Liga I: 2016–17
Dunărea Călărași
Liga II: 2017–18

References

External links
 
 

1997 births
Living people
Romanian footballers
Association football midfielders
Association football forwards
Liga I players
Liga II players
Liga III players
FC Viitorul Constanța players
FC Dunărea Călărași players
ASA 2013 Târgu Mureș players
FC Petrolul Ploiești players
FCV Farul Constanța players
CS Gloria Bistrița-Năsăud footballers